Olive is an unincorporated parcel of about  in the city of Orange, located along Lincoln Avenue, between Eisenhower Park and Orange Olive Road.

History

Members of the Tongva and Juaneño/Luiseño nations long inhabited this area. The village of Totpavit was located at what is now modern day Olive.

After the 1769 expedition of Gaspar de Portolà, a Spanish expedition led by Father Junipero Serra, named the area Vallejo de Santa Ana (Valley of Saint Anne). On November 1, 1776, Mission San Juan Capistrano became the area's first permanent European settlement in Alta California, New Spain.

In 1801, the Spanish Empire granted  to Jose Antonio Yorba, which he named Rancho San Antonio. Yorba's great Rancho included the lands where the cities of Olive, Orange, Villa Park, Santa Ana, Tustin, Costa Mesa, and Newport Beach stand today. Smaller ranchos evolved from this large rancho including the Rancho Santiago de Santa Ana.

After the Mexican-American War, Alta California was ceded to the United States by Mexico with the signing of the Treaty of Guadalupe Hidalgo in 1848, and many Californios lost the title to their lands.

In 1875, when American settlers were considering naming the town they had founded Richland, Olive was one of the proposed names, along with Lemon, Walnut, and eventually Orange was chosen because Richland was already a city in California. When the city was named Orange, California, the other three names were assigned to streets in the new town. Orange Olive Road roughly bisects the Olive community.

Setting

It is also in proximity to the Anaheim border. Olive was founded in 1887 by a developer in the olive industry. Since the community's creation, many of Olive's original 63 lots have been subdivided and are now at least  acre, in keeping with county code for the area.

With 258 residents, Olive is among the smallest "island communities" in Orange County to be recognized with a name of reputation.

The area lacks sidewalks and its many pre-1930s houses are set deep on their lots. Because Olive is small in size, there is no through traffic in the community, keeping the area convenient for its residents. The only signage identifying the community is the entrance that reads "Olive Heights" at the corner of Palm and Lincoln Avenues. Students who live there attend Olive Elementary, which closed temporarily in the 1990s due to lack of student enrollment, although it now enrolls 376 students.

Notable people

 Major League Baseball pitcher Russ Heman, (b. Feb 10, 1933)
 Jazz Composer/Arranger Bill Holman, (b. May 21, 1927)

External links
"Neighbors balk at a proposed condo project in Olive Heights", Orange County Register, November 13th, 2006

References

Orange County, California articles needing infoboxes
Unincorporated communities in Orange County, California
Unincorporated communities in California
Unreferenced Orange County, California articles